Hugh Crawford Dixon Somerset (29 August 1895 – 16 May 1968) was a notable New Zealand teacher, adult education director, university professor and writer. He was born in Belfast, North Canterbury, New Zealand in 1895. He graduated from Canterbury College with a master's thesis in 1931.

He was married to Gwen Somerset, also a notable educator.

References

1895 births
1968 deaths
New Zealand schoolteachers
New Zealand academics